Domonique is a given name. Notable people with the given name include:

Domonique Dolton (born 1989), American boxer
Domonique Foxworth (born 1983), American football player
Domonique Ramirez (born 1993), American beauty pageant titleholder
Domonique Simone (born 1971), African-American adult actress
Domonique Williams (born 1994), Trinidad and Tobago sprinter

See also
Dominique (name)